Baron Rothschild, of Tring in the County of Hertfordshire, is a title in the Peerage of the United Kingdom. It was created in 1885 for Sir Nathan Rothschild, 2nd Baronet, a member of the Rothschild banking family. He was the first Jewish member of the House of Lords not to have previously converted to Christianity. The current holder of the title is Jacob Rothschild, 4th Baron Rothschild, who inherited the barony in 1990.

History
The Rothschild baronetcy, of Grosvenor Place, was created in the Baronetage of the United Kingdom in 1847 for Anthony de Rothschild, a banker and politician, with remainder to the male issue of his elder brother, Lionel de Rothschild, the first ever practicing Jewish Member of Parliament. Both Anthony and Lionel were sons of the influential financier Nathan Mayer Rothschild (1777–1836), founder of the English branch of the Rothschild family.

The first Baronet was succeeded according to the special remainder by his nephew, the aforementioned second Baronet, who was elevated to the peerage in 1885. Although other ethnic Jews such as Sampson Eardley and Benjamin Disraeli had already received peerages, both were brought up as Christians from childhood, and Eardley's Irish peerage did not entitle him to a seat in the House of Lords. Rothschild was thus the first practicing Jew to sit in the House of Lords.

He was succeeded by his eldest son, Walter, the second Baron. He was a banker and politician but is best remembered for his interest in zoology. He died without male issue and his brother had predeceased him, so upon his death, the titles passed to his nephew Victor, the third Baron. He was the only son of the Hon. Charles Rothschild.

, the titles are held by the third Baron's eldest son, Jacob, the fourth Baron, who succeeded in 1990.

Austrian title
In 1822, the hereditary title of Freiherr (baron) of the Austrian Empire was granted in the Austrian nobility by Emperor Francis I of Austria to the five sons of Mayer Amschel Rothschild. In 1838, Queen Victoria authorized the use of this Austrian baronial title in the United Kingdom by Lionel de Rothschild and certain other members of the Rothschild family. However, the use of such foreign titles in the United Kingdom was subsequently limited by a warrant of 27 April 1932.

Rothschild baronets, of Grosvenor Place (1847)

 Sir Anthony Nathan de Rothschild, 1st Baronet (1810–1876)
 Sir Nathan Mayer Rothschild, 2nd Baronet (1840–1915) (created Baron Rothschild in 1885)

Barons Rothschild (1885)
 Nathan Mayer Rothschild, 1st Baron Rothschild (1840–1915)
 Lionel Walter Rothschild, 2nd Baron Rothschild (1868–1937)
 Nathaniel Mayer Victor Rothschild, 3rd Baron Rothschild (1910–1990)
 Nathaniel Charles Jacob Rothschild, 4th Baron Rothschild (b. 1936)

Line of succession
According to the rules of inheritance of British peerages,  the title is passed to the closest male heir (usually the eldest son) bypassing any daughters or other female family members.

 The Hon. Nathaniel Philip Rothschild (b. 1971), only son of the fourth Baron.
 James Amschel Victor Rothschild (b. 1985), nephew of the fourth Baron.
 son (b. 2022), grand-nephew of the fourth Baron.

There are no other living male-line descendants of the first Baron (so the succession currently ends there); but there are living male-line descendants of Lionel Nathan de Rothschild who are in remainder to the baronetcy only. Those in positions (4) to (9) below are these descendants:

  Nathan Mayer Rothschild (1777–1836)
  Lionel Nathan de Rothschild (1807–1879)
   Nathan Mayer de Rothschild, 1st Baron Rothschild (1840–1915)
   Lionel Walter Rothschild, 2nd Baron Rothschild (1868–1937)
 Hon. Nathaniel Charles Rothschild (1877–1923)
  Nathaniel Mayer Victor Rothschild, 3rd Baron Rothschild (1910–1990)
  Nathaniel Charles Jacob Rothschild, 4th Baron Rothschild (b. 1936)
 (1) Hon. Nathaniel Philip Victor James Rothschild (b. 1971)
 Hon. Amschel Mayor James Rothschild (1955–1996)
 (2) James Amschel Victor Rothschild (b. 1985)
 (3) son (b. 2022)
 Leopold de Rothschild (1845–1917)
 Lionel Nathan de Rothschild (1882–1942)
 Edmund Leopold de Rothschild (1916–2009)
 (4) Nicholas David Rothschild (b. 1951)
 (5) David Lionel Rothschild (b. 1955)
 (6) Leopold James Rothschild (b. 1994)
 (7) Amschel Nathaniel Rothschild (b. 1995)
 Anthony Gustav de Rothschild (1887–1961)
 Sir Evelyn Robert Adrian de Rothschild (1931-2022)
 (8) Anthony James de Rothschild (b. 1977)
 (9) David Mayer de Rothschild (b. 1978)
   Sir Anthony Nathan de Rothschild, 1st Baronet (1810–1876)

References

External links

Cracroft's Peerage page

 
Baronies in the Peerage of the United Kingdom
Noble titles created in 1885
Noble titles created for UK MPs
 
English Jews
People from Tring
Jewish families
British Jewish families